Stepp is a surname. Notable people with the surname include:

William Howard Stepp (born 1875), American fiddle player
Hans-Karl Stepp (1914–2006), German soldier
Rodney Stepp (born 1952), American keyboardist, songwriter, producer, and entrepreneur
Cathy Stepp (born 1963), American politician
Rick Stepp (born 1973), American botanist 
Blake Stepp (born 1982), American basketball player